This is a complete filmography of Fernanda Montenegro, a Brazilian actress.

Filmography

Films

Television

Stage work

Reference

External links

Montenegro, Fernanda
Filmography